A pose refers to a position of a human body.

Pose or poses or variant, may also refer to:

 to role-play, to pose as a role

People
 Pose (artist) (born 1980, as Jordan Nickel), American artist
 Andrés Rodríguez-Pose, Spanish-British professor
 Eduard Wilhelm Pose (1812–1878), German painter
 Heinz Pose (1905–1975), German physicist
 Jörg Pose (born 1959), German actor
 Ludwig Pose (1786–1877), German painter
 Martin Pose (1911–1997), Argentinian golfer
 Martina Soto Pose, Argentine reporter
 Óscar Diego Gestido Pose (1901–1967), president of Uruguay
 Scott Pose (born 1967), U.S. baseball player
 Vanessa Pose (born 1990), Venezuelan actress

Fictional characters
 Tante Pose, the titular character from the eponymous Norwegian film Tante Pose

Arts, entertainment, and media

Music
 Poses (album), Rufus Wainwright's second album, 2001
 "Pose" (Daddy Yankee song)
 "Pose" (Rihanna song)
 "Pose" (Yo Gotti song)
 "Pose", a song by Stefanie Scott and Carlon Jeffery from the A.N.T. Farm soundtrack
 "Pose", a song by Justin Timberlake from FutureSex/LoveSounds
 "Poses", a song by Rufus Wainwright and title track off the eponymous 2001 album

Other uses in arts, entertainment, and media
 Pose (TV series), an American drama television series
 a pose, a dance move in the waacking style of street dance
 a pose, a dance move in Vogue (dance)

Computers and technology
 Pose (computer vision)
 Palm OS Emulator, abbreviated as POSE
 Proof of secure erasure (PoSE), a computer security protocol for clearing a device's memory

Other uses 
 Pose (dominoes), to set the first tile in a hand of dominoes
 Poses, Eure, France; a commune of the Eure department in France
 Pose refers to the orientation and conformation of a ligand during molecular docking

See also

 Pose to pose animation
 Strike a pose (disambiguation)
 Poser (disambiguation)
 Posing (disambiguation)
 Poise (disambiguation)
 Posies (disambiguation)